The genus Agapostemon (literally "stamen loving") is a common group of Western Hemisphere sweat bees, most of which are known as metallic green sweat bees for their color.

They are members of the family of bees known as Halictidae. Unlike other sweat bees, they are not attracted to human sweat. They are generally green or blue, especially the head and thorax. Sometimes the abdomen in females is green or blue although it may be striped, and most males have the yellow-striped abdomen on a black or metallic background. They superficially resemble various members of another tribe, Augochlorini, which are also typically metallic green.

Nesting 
All species of Agapostemon nest in the ground, sometimes in dense aggregations. Some species are communal such as A. virescens. In this and other communal species, multiple females share the same nest entrance, but beneath the common entrance burrow, construct their own portion of the nest. Thus each female digs her own brood cells and collects pollen and nectar to fashion the pollen ball upon which she will lay an egg.

Unlike other social bees, in communal bees there is no reproductive division of labor. The advantage of this form of sociality seems to be that kleptoparasitic Nomada bees have greater difficulty gaining access to the nest and brood cells when there are multiple females inside. This method of defense against the Cuckoo bee (Nomada) facilitates attacks by larvae of the Blister beetle.

Range 

Some 42 species in the genus range from Canada to Argentina . In cool temperate regions, there is one generation per year, with females being active in the early summer and males and pre-diapausing females active in the late summer. Only mated females survive the winter. This is probably because unmated females cannot enter diapause. Males can often be seen in large numbers flying around shrubs with large flowers, such as Rose of Sharon. Agapostemon angelicus are native to the Texas high plains. They specialized in being pollinators for cotton.  They can serve as replacement for honey bees in pollination

Types of flight
Like other bees, A. texanus can fly from a short or long distance. Their flight patterns usually rely on flower density; they favor flowers with high densities. Their flight patterns best resemble the bumble bee and the honey bee.

Species 
Over 40 species of  Agapostemon have been identified:

 Agapostemon aenigma
 Agapostemon alayoi
 Agapostemon angelicus
 Agapostemon ascius
 Agapostemon atrocaeruleus
 Agapostemon boliviensis
 Agapostemon centratus
 Agapostemon chapadensis
 Agapostemon chiriquiensis
 Agapostemon coloradinus
 Agapostemon columbi
 Agapostemon cubensis
 Agapostemon cyaneus
 Agapostemon erebus
 Agapostemon femoratus
 Agapostemon heterurus
 Agapostemon inca
 Agapostemon insularis
 Agapostemon intermedius
 Agapostemon jamaicensis
 Agapostemon kohliellus
 Agapostemon krugii
 Agapostemon lanosus
 Agapostemon leunculus
 Agapostemon melliventris
 Agapostemon mexicanus
 Agapostemon mourei
 Agapostemon nasutus
 Agapostemon obliquus
 Agapostemon obscuratus
 Agapostemon ochromops
 Agapostemon peninsularis
 Agapostemon poeyi
 Agapostemon rhopalocerus
 Agapostemon sapphirinus
 Agapostemon semimelleus
 Agapostemon sericeus
 Agapostemon splendens
 Agapostemon swainsonae
 Agapostemon texanus
 Agapostemon tyleri
 Agapostemon viequesensis
 Agapostemon virescens
 Agapostemon viridulus

References

External links

Agapostemon identification guide
List of species
Worldwide species map
Genus Agapostemon on BugGuide

 
Bee genera
Hymenoptera of North America
Hymenoptera of South America